"Don't Stop Movin'" is a song by Italian electronic music group Livin' Joy. It is the follow-up release to their previous single, "Dreamer", which was a number-one hit in the UK. The song was released on their only album, Don't Stop Movin (1996) by Tameko Star and peaked at number one in Italy and number 12 on the Eurochart Hot 100. In the UK, the single had was released on 3 June 1996 and peaked number five on the UK Singles Chart, where it spent seven weeks in the top 10 and a 14 weeks in the top 100. It ended the year as the UK's 34th-biggest-selling single of 1996.

The single was a turning point for Livin' Joy, ushering in a new vocalist after the group failed to reach a deal with Janice Robinson, the original vocalist on "Dreamer". Tameko Star was to front the group from this point on. The frantic synths and beats of the song are sent in with Tameko’s powerful vocals and she delivered an uplifting message over the clunking energetic beat. One of self-assurance, self belief in order to succeed and achieve.

Chart performance
"Don't Stop Movin'" went on becoming a major hit on several continents, peaking at number-one in Italy. It entered the top 10 also in Finland (7), Scotland (7), Sweden (8) and the United Kingdom, where it peaked at number five on 9 June 1996 in its first week on the UK Singles Chart. The single spent seven weeks in the UK Top 10 and a 14 weeks in the Top 100. On the UK Dance Singles Chart, it reached number-one, while it peaked at number two on the Swedish Dance chart and number 12 on the Eurochart Hot 100. Additionally, the song was a top 20 hit also in Iceland (15), Ireland (14) and the Netherlands (19). Outside Europe, "Don't Stop Movin'" reached number two on the RPM Dance/Urban chart in Canada, number three on the US Billboard Dance Club Songs chart, and number six in both Australia and Israel. 

The song was awarded with a gold record in Australia and the United Kingdom, after 35,000 and 400,000 singles were sold, respectively.

Critical reception
Larry Flick from Billboard constated that the new singer of the group "has the pipes to make this happy-house anthem work". He also noted that the song "has a lot of pep and radio-friendly energy". A reviewer from Music & Media described it as a "bouncy number ready for embrace", adding, "The ingredients: a pounding beat, assured female vocals (Tameka Star) and a strong chorus. Radio should take notice." British magazine Music Week gave it four out of five, writing, "It has the same feelgood vibe and incredibly catchy hook as "Dreamer" and, although matching its success was always going to be difficult, this is pretty good going." In an retrospective review, Pop Rescue deemed it as "the motivational poster of 90s dance music", stating that Starr "makes light work of the lyrics with her powerful vocals." Dave Fawbert from ShortList complimented the song as "one of those brilliant '90s follow-ups-to-a-hit-that-is-basically-the-same-but-not-quite-as-good-but-that-basically-means-it's-still-brilliant. Coming after "Dreamer", it fulfilled its mission perfectly." Toni Birghental from Sun-Sentinel felt it "sets the album's mood. The words, "You can be mystical, magical, physically phenomenal, good to go, not too slow," along with the high energy music are great motivation for aerobics fans."

Track listings
 12-inch single – Italy (1996)
 "Don't Stop Movin'" (single version) – 3:40
 "Don't Stop Movin'" (album version) – 5:20
 "Don't Stop Movin'" (Want-Will H-Mix) – 5:59
 "Don't Stop Movin'" (A-Manetta Mix) – 5:46
 "Don't Stop Movin'" (Gettin' Right Mix) – 5:25
 "Don't Stop Movin'" (Gettin' Right Reprise) – 4:11

 CD single – France & UK (1996)
 "Don't Stop Movin'" (single version) – 3:40
 "Don't Stop Movin'" (album version) – 5:20
 "Don't Stop Movin'" (Gettin' Right Mix) – 5:25

 CD maxi – Europe (1996)
 "Don't Stop Movin'" (single version) – 3:40
 "Don't Stop Movin'" (album version) – 5:20
 "Don't Stop Movin'" (Want-Will H-Mix) – 5:59
 "Don't Stop Movin'" (A-Manetta Mix) – 5:46
 "Don't Stop Movin'" (Gettin' Right Mix) – 5:25
 "Don't Stop Movin'" (Gettin' Right Reprise) – 4:11

Charts and certifications

Weekly charts

Year-end charts

Certifications

Release history

References

1996 singles
1996 songs
Livin' Joy songs
MCA Records singles
Number-one singles in Italy